Mill Bay is a census-designated place (CDP) in Kodiak Island Borough, Alaska, United States. It was first listed as a CDP prior to the 2020 census.

Geography
Mill Bay is located at the northeast tip of Kodiak Island, surrounding the small bay for which the community is named. It is bordered to the southwest by the city of Kodiak.

Demographics

As of the 2020 census, the population of the CDP is 4,216. It is the second most populated place in the borough.

References

Census-designated places in Alaska
Census-designated places in Kodiak Island Borough, Alaska
Populated coastal places in Alaska on the Pacific Ocean